AlphaLab is an American technology startup accelerator located in Pittsburgh, PA. Founded in 2008 by Jim Jen.

AlphaLab has two subsidiaries which include AlphaLab Gear and AlphaLab Health catering to hardware and medical companies.

History 

Alphalab was founded by Jim Jen in 2008 to help startups develop and launch their products, grow their customer base, and secure venture capital funding. The specific amount of funding AlphaLab provides varies depending on the startup's needs and stage of development, but typically ranges between $25,000 and $50,000. Its structure is similar to Y Combinator. The accelerator is a subsidiary of Innovation Works which receives funding from the state of Pennsylvania for economic development. This gives it a focus on technology startups headquartered in the Pittsburgh region.

AlphaLab spunout AlphaLab Gear in 2013, and AlphaLab health in 2021. Each operate independently.

Programs 
The AlphaLab program provides startups with a  range of resources and mentorship, including access to office space, funding, legal services, and marketing. Startups that are accepted into the program typically spend 12 months working with the AlphaLab team to develop their startup. AlphaLab is part of the Global Accelerator Network which provides startups with access to a network of investors and mentors, helping them to secure additional funding and advice as they grow their businesses.

Each year, the collective AlphaLabs host host a Demoday to showcase the latest technology produced by their startup cohorts.

AlphaLab Gear
Launched in 2013, Alphalab Gear is an independent subsidiary accelerator focusing on hardware internet of things (IOT), and robotics startups. AlphaLab Gear hosts a yearly hardware startup pitch contest called the Hardware Cup where startups compete for $50,000 in investment.

AlphaLab Health 
Launched in 2022, AlphaLab Health operates as a healthcare and life sciences accelerator. It was billed as a collaboration between their parent company Innovation Works and regional hospital network Allegheny Health Network as a way to streamline medical device prototypes.

Alumni Companies 

 Identified Technologies, Drone Mapping Company. Acquired.
 NoWait, Restaurant Booking. Acquired by Yelp for $40 Million.
 The Zebra, Insurance Company

See also
 Startup accelerator

References

External links
 AlphaLab
 AlphaLab Gear
 AlphaLab Health

Business incubators of the United States
Companies based in Pittsburgh
Startup accelerators
Venture capital firms of the United States